Sudhakaran Kumar (born 1 September 1988 in) is an Indian footballer who plays as a defender for Churchill Brothers S.C. in the I-League.

Career

Churchill Brothers
After spending time with Mohun Bagan Kumar signed for Churchill Brothers in 2009.

Career statistics

Club

References

External links
Goal.com Profile

1988 births
Indian footballers
Living people
I-League players
Mohun Bagan AC players
Churchill Brothers FC Goa players
Association football defenders